North Roe is a village, and protected area at the northern tip in the large Northmavine peninsula of the Mainland of Shetland, Scotland.  It is a small village, with a school with less than a dozen pupils in 2011.  The moorland plateau to the south-west of the settlement is part of the Ronas Hill-North Roe and Tingon internationally recognised wetland site, protected under the terms of the Ramsar Convention on Wetlands, and also a Special Protection Area under the Birds Directive. The village is served by the A970 road which runs the length of the Shetland mainland from south to north and is a single-carriageway for the final nine miles.

References

External links

Canmore - North Roe site record

Villages in Mainland, Shetland
Northmavine
Ramsar sites in Scotland